Avondale is a village in New South Wales. It is located just west of Lake Illawarra.

History
In the early days Avondale had some fine cedar trees. A creek flowing through the land grant 'Avondale' became known as 'American Creek' after the American cedar cutters who cleared the land along it. In 1857 some traces of kerosene were found in the creek and shale was found on the mountain. In 1863 Edward and William Graham rented part of the Avondale estate and their brother had shale from their farm tested by the Government Analyst. "This test proved so satisfactory that he decided to open a shale mine and manufacture kerosene". (Cousins 1994, p. 182) See the Mount Kembla page for details on the Kerosene Works at American Creek.

Alpacas
In 1866 fourteen alpacas were purchased by one of the Osbornes. They travelled from Wingello in the highlands down the Bong Bong Road and seven weeks later were "now depasturing at Avondale, and apparently doing very well." (McDonald 1976, p. 41) Gradually the flock depleted due to the need for attention and lack of acclimatization and by 1880 all traces of the imported alpacas had gone.

Avondale farms
Avondale was part of Henry Osborne's large estate and dairying was its primary industry. See the Yallah history page for more information on early dairying in Avondale and Yallah.

In 1893, Henry Hill Osborne's executors put up the 'Avondale' farms for sale and most were sold at a price of 14 pounds per acre. Some of the purchasers included Thomas Armstrong, C. Heininger, George Thomas, James Dawes and E.R. Evans (McDonald 1976).

Coal mining
In 1911 Avondale mine was opened by the Illawarra Steam and Coal Company Limited. Four and a half miles of railway was to be built to the colliery (Illawarra Mercury, 1911). This colliery mined the Tongarra and Wongawilli coal seams, it closed in 1920 only to be reopened in 1939. It closed again in 1982 due to a loss of contract to supply coal to the Port Kembla Steelworks.

Huntley Colliery was a new colliery developed by the Joint Coal Board in 1952. It was purchased in 1951 by the Board and the Federal Government to meet the requirements of the new Tallawarra Power Station under construction (South Coast Times, 1952). Prior to its closure in 1989 about 2,300 tons of coal was mined a day at Huntley which worked the Wongawilli and Tongarra coal seams.

Population
The most next common country of birth was England at 6.4%. 88.0% of people only spoke English at home. The most common responses for religion were No Religion 25.5%, Catholic 23.8% and Anglican 23.7%.

See also
 Dapto, New South Wales

References

External links

Suburbs of Wollongong